Raimundo José do Rego Sarmento (born 10 October 1994) also known as Jeca is a football player who currently plays for Timor-Leste national football team.

International career
Jeca made his senior international debut against Mongolia national football team in the 2018 FIFA World Cup qualification (AFC) on 12 March 2015 as a substitute in the 89th minute to replace Diogo Santos.

References

External links
 

1994 births
Living people
East Timorese footballers
Timor-Leste international footballers
Association football defenders